Retribution, a 2003 legal thriller, is the first novel by Jilliane Hoffman. After being published in 2003 it became a top-three bestseller in the USA and top 10 in Europe. This graphic serial killer/courtroom thriller puts its readers in a situation of choice between justice and retribution in its hardest form.

2003 novels
Legal thriller novels
Novels set in New York City
Novels set in Miami
2003 debut novels